The 2016 Rugby Europe Sevens Grand Prix Series competition was restructured from the previous year, now with four divisions: Sevens Grand Prix Series, the Trophy, Conference 1, and Conference 2.

In preparation for the 2016 Olympics, instead of England, Scotland, and Wales fielding their own teams, two unified teams, the Great Britain Royals and the Great Britain Lions, took part in the Grand Prix.

Grand Prix series

Schedule

Standings
The two highest teams who did not already have "core status" on the World Rugby Sevens Series—Spain and Germany—qualified for the 2017 Hong Kong Sevens qualifier, which in turn was a qualifying event for promotion to core team status on the 2017-18 World Rugby Sevens Series.

The GB teams were not included in the final ranking

Moscow

Exeter Leg

Gdynia leg

References

Grand Prix
2016
European
2015–16 in European rugby union
2016–17 in European rugby union